The Bristol Combination Vase is an annual rugby union knock-out club competition organised by the Bristol and District Rugby Football Combination – one of the five bodies that make up the Gloucestershire Rugby Football Union.  It was first introduced during the 2003–2004 season, with the inaugural winners being Frampton Cotterell.  Prior to 2003–04 there had been a plate competition for teams knocked out of the early round of the Bristol Combination Cup, although the vase was not a direct replacement as it was a separate competition intended for lower ranked sides in the Bristol region.  It is the second most important competition organised by the Bristol Combination, behind the Bristol Combination Cup but in front of the Bristol Combination Cyril Parsons Bowl. 

The Bristol Combination Vase is currently open for clubs sides based in Bristol and the surrounding countryside (including parts of Gloucestershire and Somerset), typically based between tier 7 (Tribute Western Counties North) and tier 8 (Gloucester Premier/Tribute Somerset Premier).  The format is a cup knockout with a first round, quarter-finals, semi-finals and a final held at a neutral venue between April–May.

Winners

Number of wins
Old Bristolians (3)
Barton Hill (2)
Southmead (2)
Avonmouth Old Boys (1)
Bristol Saracens (1)
Bishopston (1)
Clevedon (1)
Frampton Cotterell (1)
Gordano (1)
Old Colstonians (1)
Whitehall (1)

Notes

See also
 Gloucestershire RFU
 Bristol and District Rugby Football Combination
 Bristol Combination Cup
 Bristol Combination Cyril Parsons Bowl
 English rugby union system
 Rugby union in England

References

External links
 Gloucestershire RFU
 Bristol & District Rugby Football Combination

Recurring sporting events established in 2002
2002 establishments in England
Rugby union cup competitions in England
Rugby union in Bristol
Rugby union in Gloucestershire
Rugby union in Somerset
Vase sports trophies